Villafalletto is a comune (municipality) in the Province of Cuneo in the Italian region Piedmont, located about  south of Turin and about  north of Cuneo.

Villafalletto borders the following municipalities: Busca, Centallo, Costigliole Saluzzo, Fossano, Savigliano, Tarantasca, Verzuolo, and Vottignasco. It is located on the right bank of the Maira.

Villafalletto is the birthplace of anarchist Bartolomeo Vanzetti, executed with Nicola Sacco in 1927 following a controversial American trial.

Twin towns
 Torremaggiore, Italy, since 2009

References

Cities and towns in Piedmont